Mark Dion (born August 28, 1961) is an American conceptual artist best known for his use of scientific presentations in his installations. His work examines the manner in which prevalent ideologies and institutions influence our understanding of history, knowledge and the natural world. The job of the artist, according to him, is to "go against the grain of dominant culture, to challenge perception and convention". By locating the roots of environmental politics and public policy in the construction of knowledge about nature, Dion questions the objectivity and authoritative role of the scientific voice in contemporary society, tracking how pseudo-science, social agendas and ideology creep into public discourse and knowledge production. Some of his well known works include Neukom Vivarium (2006), a permanent outdoor installation and learning lab for the Olympic Sculpture Park in Seattle, Washington.

Early life and education 
Dion was born in August 28, 1961, New Bedford, Massachusetts, to a working-class family. He spent his early childhood in New Bedford before relocating to Fairhaven, Massachusetts, where he was mostly raised. Dion credits the museums and historical architecture in both towns, such as the New Bedford Whaling Museum, in helping spark his interests.

Dion began attending the University of Hartford School of Art in 1981. He concurrently took classes at the School of Visual arts in New York from 1983 till 1984 and later participated at the one-year Independent Study Program of the Whitney Museum of American Art, where he studied with conceptual artists Joseph Kosuth and Hans Hacke, and media artist Barbara Kruger. There, he was encouraged by faculty to utilize interdisciplinary approaches that would afford a unity of his wide-ranging interests, and he began creating installations inspired by his passion for research and collecting.

Dion took classes in biology at City College and attended several reading seminars to develop a solid foundation in science. He worked with fellow students Gregg Bourdowitz, Jason Simon, Craig Owens.

Dion experienced financial issues while attending school, leading him to work thirty hours a week as an art conservator in SoHo, Manhattan that specialized in nineteenth century American art. Although, Dion credits his time there as helping him see representations as objects, saying "Working in the studio, one would see an object in the middle of its life. I found that incredibly interesting."

Dion received his Bachelor of Fine Arts degree from the University of Hartford School of Art in 1986.

Career 
Dion worked on several small projects like The Department of Marine Animal identification of the City of New York (Chinatown division), which gave way to his big collaborations with the Wexner Center for the Arts at Ohio State University and the Weisman Art Museum at the University of Minnesota.

Tate Thames Dig at the Tate Gallery (1999) 
One of Dion's first big projects was with the Tate Britain in London. As part of Tate Modern's re-opening programme, Dion and a team of volunteers combed the shore of the river at Bankside in front of Tate Modern, and at Millbank, opposite Tate Britain, in search of artifacts and ephemeral buried beneath the mud and gravel of its beaches. A wide variety of objects and fragments were uncovered, ranging from clay pipes, oyster shells and cattle teeth to plastic toys and shoes. The more unusual finds included a bottle containing a letter in Arabic script, pieces of Bartmann jugs and a fragment of human shinbone. "Archaeologists tents" were then set up on the lawn outside Tate Britain, where each item was meticulously cleaned and identified by professionals including Museum of London staff, Thames River Police, and ecologists.

Once collected and processed Mark Dion created an artwork from the objects and artefacts. The finds are presented as an installation, arranged in a mahogany cabinet alongside photographs of the beachcombers and tidal flow charts.

First shown at the Tate Gallery as an Art Now installation between October 1999 and January 2000, the finds for Tate Thames Dig are presented according to location in a double-sided old-fashioned mahogany cabinet, alongside photographs of the beachcombers and tidal flow charts. There are also five "treasure chests" which contain larger items, but which are not part of this work. Organized loosely according to type (such as bones, glassware, pottery, metal objects), the viewer finds them in seemingly unhistorical and largely uninterpreted arrangements. Antique items sit alongside contemporary items, ephemera and detritus are next to objects of value. Each is a material witness, performing the same function as a historical proof. This lack of distinction is an important aspect of Dion's approach, and he resists the reading of history as a necessarily linear progression. The only differentiation is a geographical one, the two sites retaining their individual identities. The lack of historical categorisation suggests a subversion of standard museological practice. Viewers are free to create their own associations, to trace histories across time, not necessarily in a linear direction.

New England Digs (2001) 
In 2001, assisted by students at Brown University and the Rhode Island School of Design, Dion conducted excavations in a garbage heap on the edge of Seekonk River, a burned-down 19th century waterfront site along the Narragansett Bay, in New Bedford, and a dump alongside the edge of a cemetery in Brockton, Massachusetts. The group along with Dion unearthed and collected a plethora of items and contemporary artifacts, all of which were cleaned, categorized and complied into an exhibition named the New England Digs.

The material culture unearthed in New England Digs yielded three unique yet related assemblages, pointing to regional legacies of economic vitality—New Bedford was once a major whaling hub, Providence was a booming trade center and producer of jewelry, and Brockton was the shoe capital of the world—as well as their decline. But in Dion’s quintessential style, historically significant finds are democratically mingled with refuse and it all looks stunning. “There is a long history of using trash in modern art”, Dion has stated, “but here objects are allowed to exist as what they are or were, without metaphor, noninterpretive, not even archaeological.

Cabinet of Curiosities at the Weisman Art Museum (2001) 
In 2001, Dion collaborated with some few students from the University of Minnesota and Colleen. J. Sheehy, director of Weisman Art Museum, to present an exhibition based on the Cabinet of Curiosities exhibit he had done for the Wexner Center for the Arts at the Ohio State University in 1997. The project spanned from February through May 2001.

Rescue Archeology: A Project for the Museum of Modern Art (2004) 
In the year 2000, the Museum of Modern Art's sculpture garden underwent an extensive rebuilding project. Dion lead the series of archaeological digs in the garden, recovering a pillar and fragments of the limestone foundation from the nine-story townhouse. A month later he scavenged again in the garden, as well as in the hollowed-out brownstones adjoining the Museum to the west and in the newly-demolished Dorset Hotel. His findings included historical artifacts such as cornices, moldings, shards of ceramic and glass, sections of fireplace mantels, wallpaper pieces, and bricks from distinct phases of the Museum’s expansion, as well as more recent ephemera, including the remains of Bruce Nauman’s Audio-Visual Underground Chamber (1972–74), which had been installed in the garden as part of the artist’s 1995 retrospective.

A series of six fireplace mantels salvaged from the brownstones adjacent to the Museum and fully restored by the Dion, are intended to refer to the living room of Abby and John D. Rockefeller, Jr., renowned for its warmth and intimacy. A custom-made cabinet presents objects cleaned and classified not by scientific criteria but by the artist’s own logic; visitors are invited to peruse its contents and appreciate its odd organizational paradigms. Finally, a functional laboratory and a group of photographs recording Dion’s behind-the-scenes archaeological “performance”, as he calls it, reveal an interest in experimentation and process that balances his investment in the finished product.

Neukom Vivarium (2006) 
The Neukom Vivarium is considered one of Dion’s most notable works. It is a permanent installation located in the Olympic Sculpture Park in Seattle, Washington. Dion utilized a  fallen Western Hemlock tree as the nurse log inside an -long greenhouse. The tree “inhabits an art system”, according to commentary by the Seattle Art Museum. By “inhabits”, they mean insects, fungi, lichen, and other plants. Visitors are provided with magnifying glasses and field guides if they find a creature particularly attention-grabbing. By virtue of being organic, Neukom Vivarium is an ever-evolving piece. Bacteria and mushrooms appearing one day may be replaced with moss and bugs the very next.

Miami Art Museum (2006) 
In 2006, Mark Dion conducted a large installation at the South Florida Wildlife Rescue Unit that focused on the Everglades and human attempts to control the South Florida ecosystem.

Interweaving the diverse disciplines of art, science, ecology, history, and archeology, Dion’s project consists of three parts, corresponding to the three major periods of Everglades history: exploration (late 1700s – mid 1800s); exploitation (mid-1800s – early 20th century); and preservation and restoration (mid-20th century – the present).

The largest component of the installation features a facsimile of a vehicle and equipment belonging to an imaginary agency that rushes into vulnerable ecosystems to save threatened plants and animals: the South Florida Wildlife Rescue Unit.  

The second portion of the installation is a series of reproductions of vintage photographs taken in the early decades of the 20th century by John Kunkel Small, a curator of the New York Botanical Garden who identified numerous plant species in the Everglades and authored a scathing book entitled From Eden to Sahara: Florida’s Tragedy, which documented the changes wrought by dredging and draining the area.

The third portion consists of a vitrine containing artifacts, including a book of pressed specimens, the Herbarium Perrine (Marine Algae), purportedly belonging to 19th century botanist and early Florida settler Henry Perrine. Perrine was partly responsible for the overzealous introduction of foreign plant species to the area, which now poses one of the gravest threats to the ecosystem. Like the installation’s vehicle, the vitrine and its components are a fiction invented by the artist.

The Undisciplined Collector at Brandeis University (2015) 

In 2015, Mark Dion completed his permanent installation, The Undisciplined Collector, in a small ground-floor gallery inside the Rose Art Museum at Brandeis University in Waltham, Massachusetts. The room-sized space is a recreation of a 1961-style residential "den", a wunderkammer or time capsule filled with authentic period artifacts gleaned from various Brandeis collections. The year 1961 was the birth year of both the artist and the museum, and some of the exhibits reflect news coverage of the latter's debut. The collections on view include vintage record albums and magazines, cocktail swizzle sticks, Chinese snuff bottles, small sculptures, and other minor artworks, trophies, and souvenirs which were available in that year.

Visitors may enter the installation to examine the artifacts at close range, and to relax on the retro-replica sofa while reading. The furnishings were custom-built to the artist's specifications, and reflect the Mid-century modern style of the time. A small passport-sized 40-page booklet narrates the history of the Rose Art Museum, and the sourcing of some of the artifacts on view. A set of three blue insert sheets catalogs many of the artworks and other items on display; copies of the booklet can be purchased for $5 from an attendant at the entry to the museum.

The Trouble with Jellyfish at Le Laboratoire (2015) 
A temporary exhibition at Le Laboratoire in Cambridge, Massachusetts focused on jellyfish and their role in past and currently-changing ecologies. The show included a mock Victorian classroom and a mock bakery storefront featuring foods made with jellyfish. A centerpiece was a large aquarium tank containing hundreds of live jellyfish, undulating gently while suspended in space. The exhibition was partially sponsored by the Harvard Wyss Institute for Biologically Inspired Engineering, and the New England Aquarium.

Solo exhibitions 

Dion's works include Follies at Storm King Art Center (2019); Theatre of the Natural World at the Whitechapel Gallery, London (2018); Misadventures of a 21st Century Naturalist at the Institute of Contemporary Art Boston (2017); Mark Dion: The Academy of Things at The Academy of Fine Arts Design in Dresden, Germany (2014); The Macabre Treasury at Museum Het Domein in Sittard, The Netherlands (2013); Oceanomania: Souvenirs of Mysterious Seas at Musée Océanographique de Monaco and Nouveau Musée National de Monaco / Villa Paloma in Monaco (2011); The Marvelous Museum: A Mark Dion Project at Oakland Museum of California (2010–11); Systema Metropolis at Natural History Museum, London (2007); The South Florida Wildlife Rescue Unit at Miami Art Museum (2006); Rescue Archaeology, a project for the Museum of Modern Art (2004); and his renowned Tate Thames Dig at the Tate Gallery in London (1999).

Other works 

In 2012, Dion's work was included in dOCUMENTA 13, curated by Carolyn Christov-Bakargiev in Kassel, Germany, and has also been exhibited at MoMA PS1 in New York, Guggenheim Bilbao, Minneapolis Institute of Art, Tate Gallery, and the Museum of Modern Art. The artist has also completed other public commissions which include Den, a site-specific installation for the National Tourist Routes in Norway (2012), An Archaeology of Knowledge for Johns Hopkins University (2012), and Ship in a Bottle for Port of Los Angeles Waterfront (2011).

Recent years 
Dion resides with his wife, artist Dana Sherwood, in Copake, New York, and continues to conducts his works worldwide. He currently mentors at Columbia University and is co-director of Mildred's Lane, a visual art education and residency program in Beach Lake, Pennsylvania. He continues to make frequent collaborations with museums of natural history, aquariums, zoos and other institutions mandated to produce public knowledge on the topic of nature.

Dion is the subject of a monograph published by Phaidon, and a documentary episode of the PBS series Art:21.

In 2015, Dion visited Colgate University to conduct works shops and lectures with students and faculty.

Awards and nominations 
Dion received the ninth annual Larry Aldrich Foundation Award (2001), The Joan Mitchell Foundation Award (2007), the Smithsonian American Art Museum's Lucida Art Award (2008), and a Guggenheim Fellowship (2019).

Dion has received several Honorary degrees, including an honorary doctorate in Philosophy from the University of Hartford in 2003, an Honorary Fellowship of the Falmouth University (2014) and an Honorary Doctorate of Humane Letters (PhD) from the Wagner Free Institute of Science in Philadelphia (2015).

References

Further reading
 Dion, Mark, and Colleen J. Sheehy. Cabinet of Curiosities: Mark Dion and the University As Installation. Catalog of an exhibition at the Weisman Art Museum from Feb. 24 to May 27, 2001. Minneapolis, Minn.: University of Minnesota Press, 2006 (in libraries)
 Dion, Mark, Petra Lange-Berndt, Dietmar Rübel, Katherine Vanovitch, and Thea Miklowski. Mark Dion: The Academy of Things = Die Akademie der Dinge. Köln: König, 2015 (in libraries)

External links
 Review by Roberta Smith, New York Times, of Dion's 2013 gallery exhibition at Tanya Bonakdar Gallery
 Interview with Dion, March 22, 2013, Artforum.com
 Preview of interview with Dion, Artforum, September 2012 (subscription required to view full article)

1961 births
Living people
American installation artists
Artists from Massachusetts
Columbia University faculty
People from New Bedford, Massachusetts
University of Hartford alumni
American conceptual artists